Ralph Monroe Parsons (c 1896–20 December 1974) was an American engineer and businessperson. He was the founder of the Parsons Corporation.

Biography
Parsons was interested in engineering from an early age. Aged 13, he opened a garage and machine shop in Amagansett, Long Island, with his brother. He studied machine design at Pratt Institute and graduated in 1916. He then enlisted in the US Navy, leaving in the mid-1920s to specialize in oil refinery engineering.

During World War II, Parsons formed a partnership with Stephen D. Bechtel (later his chief rival) and John A. McCone (later head of the Central Intelligence Agency). In 1944, he founded Ralph M. Parsons Company. The company managed the construction of petroleum refineries, chemical plants, mines, metallurgical facilities, missile and space vehicle launching facilities and nuclear plants.

Parsons remained chairman and chief executive officer of the company until his death. He died aged 78 in December 1974 in San Marino, California. The Ralph M. Parsons Foundation is named after him.

References

1974 deaths
American company founders
American engineers